The Jesselton Residences is a 28-storey triplet tower comprising shopping malls and condominium. The shopping mall is known as Jesselton Mall which was also the first and only upscale duty free mall in Borneo.

History 
Originally developed by Palikota Sdn Bhd, a subsidiary of Jesselton Waterfront Holdings, the building construction project awarded to a French firm Vinci Grand Projects Sdn Bhd in 2014 to complete it.

In early 2017, the building received the certificate of occupancy and will start to 
open for retail leasing following the building completion.

See also
List of tallest buildings in Kota Kinabalu
Jesselton Twin Towers

References 

Buildings and structures in Kota Kinabalu
Shopping malls in Sabah
Condominiums in Malaysia